Janik Haberer (born 2 April 1994) is a German professional footballer who plays as a midfielder for Bundesliga club Union Berlin.

Career
On 9 May 2022, SC Freiburg announced that after six seasons with the club, Haberer would sign with Union Berlin for the 2022–23 Bundesliga season. On 16 October 2022, he scored his first Bundesliga brace in a 2–0 win for Union Berlin against Borussia Dortmund.

Career statistics

Club

Honours
Germany U21
 UEFA European Under-21 Championship: 2017

References

External links
 

1994 births
Living people
People from Wangen im Allgäu
Sportspeople from Tübingen (region)
Association football forwards
German footballers
Footballers from Baden-Württemberg
Germany youth international footballers
Germany under-21 international footballers
Bundesliga players
2. Bundesliga players
3. Liga players
Regionalliga players
FV Ravensburg players
SpVgg Unterhaching players
SpVgg Unterhaching II players
TSG 1899 Hoffenheim players
TSG 1899 Hoffenheim II players
VfL Bochum players
SC Freiburg players
1. FC Union Berlin players
21st-century German people